Telefunken was a German radio and television apparatus company, founded in Berlin in 1903, as a joint venture of Siemens & Halske and the Allgemeine Elektrizitäts-Gesellschaft (AEG) ('General electricity company').

The name "Telefunken" appears in:
 the product brand name "Telefunken";
 Gesellschaft für drahtlose Telegraphie m.b.H., System Telefunken, founded 1903 in Berlin as a subsidiary of AEG and Siemens & Halske;
 Telefunken, Gesellschaft für drahtlose Telegraphie m.b.H. (from 1923 to 1955 – since 1941 subsidiary of the AEG only);
 Telefunken GmbH in 1955;
 Telefunken Aktiengesellschaft (AG) in 1963;
 Merger of AEG and Telefunken to form Allgemeine Elektrizitäts-Gesellschaft AEG-Telefunken (from 1967 to 1979);
 AEG-TELEFUNKEN AG (from 1979 to 1985);
 TELEFUNKEN Fernseh und Rundfunk GmbH, Hanover (1972, subsidiary of AEG-TELEFUNKEN);
 Telefunken electronic GmbH (a spin-off of AEG-Telefunken and DASA
  the company  (since 1992)
 the company Telefunken USA in 2001, now "Telefunken Elektroakustik" (2009);
 the company "" in Heilbronn, Germany (since 2009);
 the company "Telefunken Lighting technologies S.L." (2009)

The company Telefunken USA was incorporated in early 2001 to provide restoration services and build reproductions of vintage Telefunken microphones.

History

Around the start of the 20th century, two groups of German researchers worked on the development of techniques for wireless communication. The one group at AEG, led by Adolf Slaby and Georg Graf von Arco, developed systems for the Kaiserliche Marine; the other one, under Karl Ferdinand Braun, at Siemens, for the German Army. Their main competitor was the British Marconi Company.

When a dispute concerning patents arose between the two companies, Kaiser Wilhelm II urged both parties to join efforts, creating Gesellschaft für drahtlose Telegraphie System Telefunken ("The Company for Wireless Telegraphy Ltd.") joint venture on 27 May 1903, with the disputed patents and techniques invested in it. On 17 April 1923, it was renamed Telefunken, The Company for Wireless Telegraphy. Telefunken was the company's telegraphic address. The first technical director of Telefunken was Count Georg von Arco.

Telefunken rapidly became a major player in the radio and electronics fields, both civilian and military. Prior to World War I the company set up the first world wide network of communications and during the war they supplied radio sets and telegraphy equipment for the military, as well as building one of the first radio navigation systems for the Zeppelin force. The Telefunken Kompass Sender operated from 1908 to 1918, allowing the Zeppelins to navigate throughout the North Sea area in any weather.

Starting in 1923, Telefunken built broadcast transmitters and radio sets.  In 1928, Telefunken made history by designing the V-41 amplifier for the German Radio Network. This was the very first two-stage, "Hi-Fi" amplifier. Over time, Telefunken perfected their designs and in 1950 the V-72 amplifier was developed. The TAB (a manufacturing subcontractor to Telefunken) V-72 soon became popular with other radio stations and recording facilities. The V-72S was the only type of amplifier found in the REDD.37 console used by the Beatles at Abbey Road Studios on many of their early recordings. In 1932, record players were added to the product line.

In 1941, Siemens transferred its Telefunken shares to AEG as part of the agreements known as the "Telefunken settlement", and AEG thus became the sole owner and continued to lead Telefunken as a subsidiary (starting in 1955 as "Telefunken GmbH" and from 1963 as "Telefunken AG").

During the Second World War, Telefunken was a supplier of vacuum tubes, transmitters and radio relay systems, and developed Funkmess facilities (later referred to as radar devices by the US Navy)  and directional finders, as part of the German air defence against aerial bombing. During the war, manufacturing plants were shifted to and developed in west of Germany or relocated. Thus, Telefunken, under AEG, turned into the smaller subsidiary, with the three divisions realigning and data processing technology, elements as well as broadcast, television and phono. Telefunken was also the originator of the FM radio broadcast system. Telefunken, through the subsidiary company Teldec (a joint venture with Decca Records), was for many decades one of the largest German record companies, until Teldec was sold to WEA in 1988.

In 1959, Telefunken established a modern semiconductor works in Heilbronn, where in April 1960 production began. The works was expanded several times, and in 1970 a new 6-storey building was built at the northern edge of the area. At the beginning of the 1970s it housed approximately 2,500 employees.

In 1967, Telefunken was merged with AEG, which was then renamed to AEG-Telefunken. In the beginning of the 1960s, Walter Bruch developed the PAL-colour television system for the company, in use by most countries of the western Hemisphere (except United States, Canada, Mexico and the western part of South America). PAL is established i.e. in the United Kingdom (PAL-I) and, except France, many other European countries -–also in Brazil (PAL-M), Argentina (PAL-N), South Africa, India and Australia.

The mainframe computer TR 4 was developed at Telefunken in Backnang, and the  model was developed at Telefunken in Konstanz, including the first ball-based mouse named Rollkugel in 1968. The computers were in use at many German university computing centres from the 1970s to around 1985. The development and manufacture of large computers was separated in 1974 to the Konstanz Computer Company (CGK). The production of mini- and process computers was integrated into the automatic control engineering division of AEG. When AEG was bought by Daimler in 1985, "Telefunken" was dropped from the company name.

In 1995, Telefunken was sold to Tech Sym Corporation (owners of Continental Electronics Corporation of Dallas) for $9 million. However, Telefunken remained a German company.

In the 1970s and early 1980s, Telefunken was also instrumental in the development of high quality audio noise reduction systems, including  (marketed since 1975), High Com (marketed since 1978), High Com II, High Com III, High Com FM, and CX (1982).

In 2005, Telefunken Sender Systeme Berlin changed its name to Transradio SenderSysteme Berlin AG. The name "Transradio" dates back to 1918, when Transradio was founded as a subsidiary of Telefunken. A year later, in 1919, Transradio made history by introducing duplex transmission. Transradio has specialized in research, development and design of modern AM, VHF/FM and DRM broadcasting systems.

In August 2006, it was acquired by the Turkish company Profilo Telra, one of the largest European manufacturers of TV-devices, with brand-owner Telefunken Licenses GmbH granting a license for the Telefunken trademark rights and producing televisions under that name.

In 2000, Toni Roger Fishman acquired the diamond-shaped logo and the Telefunken brand name from Telefunken Licenses for use in North America. The company "Telefunken USA"  was incorporated in early 2001 to provide restoration services and build exact reproductions of vintage Telefunken microphones. In 2003, Telefunken USA won a TEC Award for Studio Microphone Technology for their exact reproduction of the original Ela M 250 / 251 Microphone system. Telefunken USA has since received several TEC Awards nominations for the following microphone systems: the Telefunken USA M12 or C12 (originally developed by AKG), the R-F-T M16 MkII, and the AK47. The Historic Telefunken Ela M251 microphone system entered the MIX foundation's Hall of fame in 2006. In 2008, Telefunken USA won a second TEC Award for its new Ela M 260 microphone.

As a result of a conference held in Frankfurt in May 2009, Telefunken USA has been renamed Telefunken Elektroakustik ("Electrical Acoustics") Division of Telefunken and awarded the exclusive rights to manufacture a wide variety of professional audio products and vacuum tubes bearing the Telefunken trademark in over 27 countries. Telefunken Elektroakustik now uses the Telefunken trademark for professional audio equipment and component-based electronics, such as capacitors, transformers, vacuum tubes in Asia, Europe, North America, Oceania and South America.

Business fields 
The old Telefunken company had produced an extensive product spectrum of devices and systems from 1903 to 1996. Common characteristics are the authority for high frequency and communications technology and the construction unit and infrastructure technology necessary for it. Among other things:

 Energy-saving lighting technology
 Analogue computers
 Voucher recognition, pattern recognition and letter sorting
 Data communications networks
 Digital computer for exchange technique, air traffic control, scientific, military applications
 Electrical elements
 Electro-acoustic plants and studio equipment
 Flight guidance systems
 Guidance and weapon deployment systems
 Radio and data communication for applications of military
 Radios for authority and operating radio
 Semiconductors, circuits, solar cells, infrared modules
 Mobile radio engineering
 Direction finder and detection
 Phono and tape decks, videodisc
 Power tools
 Radar facilities for soil, flight and ship monitoring
 Radio and TV home receivers
 Vacuum tubes
 Radio relay link and satellite technology
 Records
 Sending and receipt tubes, travelling field tubes, color image tubes
 Transmitters for broadcast and television, DAB transmitters
 Speech recognition
 Telephone, long-distance traffic, cable technology.

Locations and manufacturing plants

Into the 1930s years, production was made after a distributor in the workshops of the two parent companies. The company headquarters was located in Berlin Kreuzberg, Hallesches Ufer 30 (1918–1937).

The first commercially made electronic television sets with cathode ray tubes were manufactured by Telefunken in Berlin in 1932.

Starting from 1938, manufacturing and developing plants were concentrated at the new headquarters (until 1945) in Berlin Zehlendorf, Goerzallee.

During the Second World War, there were further manufacturing plants in the Berlin area, in Thuringia, Saxonia, Moravia, Silesia, on Rügen. In addition, in Baltic countries at Tallinn and Riga, and in occupied areas of Poland at Kraków and Łódź, floats and works were established. The vacuum tube factory Łódź was shifted with the staff in August 1944 to Ulm (Fortress Wilhelmsburg).

After the Second World War, new firm locations for development and production were established. The company headquarters was located first in Berlin-Schöneberg (1945–1948), then in Berlin-Kreuzberg (1948–1952), Berlin-Moabit (1952–1960) and Berlin Charlottenburg (1960–1967).

Production plants were located in:

 Backnang: Long-distance communications and cable technology (now Tesat-Spacecom)
 Berlin-Moabit, Sickingenstr. 20–26: Broadcast and television transmitters, mobile communications (since 2005 Transradio SenderSysteme Berlin AG, later simply known as Transradio)
 Berlin-Moabit, Sickingenstr. 71: Tubes (since 2005: JobCenter Berlin Mitte, employment agency)
 Berlin-Wedding (current: Gesundbrunnen), Schwedenstr.: Broadcast sets, phono and tape decks, videocassette recorders, Videodisc players
 Celle: Color television sets (1966–1997), buildings completely demolished 2001/2002
 Eiweiler: High-frequency engineering
 Hanover, Göttinger Chaussee 76: Broadcast and television sets, acoustic engineering (until 1973)
 Heilbronn: Semiconductors, circuits, solar cells, infrared modules (1998–2008 Atmel; since 2009  (subsidiary of Tejas Silicon Holdings, UK; Insolvency of Telefunken Semiconductors in April 2013)
 Konstanz: Computer technology, letter sorting systems, character recognition technology, air traffic control systems, studio tape decks, cash dispensing machines
 Offenburg: Long-distance communications technologies
 Osterode am Harz (former Kuba-Imperial plant): Videocassette recorder
 Ulm, Danube valley: Television picture tubes
 Ulm, Elisabethenstrasse: Radar, radiolocation, detection equipment, speech and radio data transmission systems, Research Centre (2000: EADS Racoms – Radio Communication Systems; then Cassidian, part of EADS Defence & Security, today Airbus Defence and Space, today Elbit Systems)
 Ulm, Söflinger Strasse: Tubes
 Wolfenbüttel: Electroacoustics (from 1973 on)

See also
 Transistron (Duodiode) - parallel discovery of the bipolar transistor by Herbert F. Mataré and Heinrich Welker in 1948/1949

Notes

References
 M. Friedewald: Telefunken und der deutsche Schiffsfunk 1903–1914. In: Zeitschrift für Unternehmensgeschichte 46. Nr. 1, 2001, S. 27–57
 M. Fuchs: Georg von Arco (1869–1940) – Ingenieur, Pazifist, Technischer Direktor von Telefunken. Eine Erfinderbiographie. Verlag für Geschichte der Naturwissenschaften und der Technik, Berlin & München: Diepholz 2003
 L. U. Scholl: Marconi versus Telefunken: Drahtlose Telegraphie und ihre Bedeutung für die Schiffahrt. In: G. Bayerl, W. Weber (ed.): Sozialgeschichte der Technik. Ulrich Troitzsche zum 60. Geburtstag. Waxmann, Münster 1997 (Cottbuser Studien zur Geschichte von Technik, Arbeit und Umwelt, 7)
 Telefunken Sendertechnik GmbH: 90 Jahre Telefunken. Berlin 1993
 Erdmann Thiele (ed.): Telefunken nach 100 Jahren – Das Erbe einer deutschen Weltmarke. Nicolaische Verlagsbuchhandlung, Berlin 2003,

External links

Telefunken
Telefunken Elektroakustik, formerly Telefunken USA
Transradio SenderSysteme Berlin AG
Telefunken ID Systems
Telefunken record discography
Toni Fishman Interview NAMM Oral History Library (2021)

AEG
Avionics companies
Clock brands
Defunct mobile phone manufacturers
Electronics companies of Germany
German brands
German record labels
Manufacturing companies based in Berlin
Manufacturing companies established in 1903
Mobile phone manufacturers
Radio manufacturers